The UK Albums Chart is one of many music charts compiled by the Official Charts Company that calculates the best-selling albums of the week in the United Kingdom. Before 2004, the chart was only based on the sales of physical albums. This list shows albums that peaked in the top ten of the UK Albums Chart during 2002, as well as albums which peaked in 2001 and 2003 but were in the top ten in 2002. The entry date is when the album appeared in the top ten for the first time (week ending, as published by the Official Charts Company, which is six days after the chart is announced).

One-hundred and twenty-six albums were in the top ten this year. Sixteen albums from 2001 remained in the top 10 for several weeks at the beginning of the year, while Come Away with Me by Norah Jones, Justified by Justin Timberlake, Let Go by Avril Lavigne and Missundaztood by Pink were all released in 2002 but did not reach their peak until 2003. All Rise by Blue, Read My Lips by Sophie Ellis-Bextor and Songs in A Minor by Alicia Keys were the albums from 2001 to reach their peak in 2002. Four artists scored multiple entries in the top 10 in 2002. Avril Lavigne, Justin Timberlake, Pink, Shakira and Sugababes were among the many artists who achieved their first UK charting top 10 album in 2002.

The 2001 Christmas number-one album, Swing When You're Winning by Robbie Williams, remained at the top spot for the first two weeks of 2002. The first new number-one album of the year was Just Enough Education to Perform by Stereophonics. Overall, twenty-seven different albums peaked at number-one in 2002, with Robbie Williams (2) having the most albums hit that position.

Background

Multiple entries
One-hundred and twenty-six albums charted in the top 10 in 2002, with one-hundred and nine albums reaching their peak this year (including The Platinum Collection and The Very Best of Sting & The Police, which both charted in previous years but reached a peak on their latest chart run).

Four artists scored multiple entries in the top 10 in 2002. Badly Drawn Boy, Blue, Robbie Williams and Westlife were the acts who had two top 10 albums this year. Badly Drawn Boy's two entries were both released this year.

Chart debuts
Forty-three artists achieved their first top 10 album in 2002 as a lead artist. Badly Drawn Boy had one more entry in his breakthrough year.

The following table (collapsed on desktop site) does not include acts who had previously charted as part of a group and secured their first top 10 solo album, or featured appearances on compilations or other artists recordings. 
 

Notes
Darren Hayes scored two top 10 albums with the group Savage Garden prior to the launch of his solo career; debut release Spin peaked at number 2 in April 2002. Justin Timberlake's first post-NSYNC project Justified rose to number-one in February 2003; none of the group's three albums had reached the top 10.

Soundtracks
Soundtrack albums for various films entered the top 10 throughout the year. These included About a Boy, The Lord of the Rings: The Fellowship of the Ring: Original Motion Picture Soundtrack and Spirit: Stallion of the Cimarron.

Best-selling albums
Robbie Williams had the best-selling album of the year with Escapology. The album spent fourteen weeks in the top 10 (including seven weeks at number one), sold over 1.2 million copies and was certified 5× platinum by the BPI. Missundaztood by Pink came in second place. Enrique Iglesias' Escape, A Rush of Blood to the Head from Coldplay and One Love by Blue made up the top five. Albums by Red Hot Chili Peppers, Eminem, Westlife, Elvis Presley and Oasis were also in the top ten best-selling albums of the year.

Top-ten albums
Key

Entries by artist
The following table shows artists who achieved two or more top 10 entries in 2002, including albums that reached their peak in 2001. The figures only include main artists, with featured artists and appearances on compilation albums not counted individually for each artist. The total number of weeks an artist spent in the top ten in 2002 is also shown.

Notes

 Missundaztood reached its peak of number two on 18 January 2003 (week ending).
 Come Away with Me reached its peak of number one on 8 March 2003 (week ending).
 Let Go reached its peak of number one on 11 January 2003 (week ending).
 Justified reached its peak of number one on 1 February 2003.
 All Rise re-entered the top 10 at number 7 on 30 March 2002 (week ending) for 2 weeks.
 Just Enough Education to Perform re-entered the top 10 at number 4 on 5 January 2002 (week ending) for 10 weeks.
 Sunshine re-entered the top 10 at number 8 on 2 March 2002 (week ending). 
 World of Our Own re-entered the top 10 at number 7 on 23 February 2002 (week ending) for 4 weeks.
 No Angel re-entered the top 10 at number 7 on 5 January 2002 (week ending) for 6 weeks, at number 9 on 23 February 2002 (week ending) for 5 weeks and at number 8 on 6 July 2002 (week ending) for 2 weeks.
 Gold: The Greatest Hits re-entered the top 10 at number 8 on 5 January 2002 (week ending) for 2 weeks.
 Freak of Nature re-entered the top 10 at number 10 on 30 March 2002 (week ending) and at number 10 on 13 April 2002 (week ending) for 6 weeks.
 Their Greatest Hits: The Record re-entered the top 10 at number 6 on 29 December 2001 (week ending) for 2 weeks.
 Read My Lips re-entered the top 10 at number 9 on 12 January 2002 (week ending) for 5 weeks and at number 2 on 29 June 2002 (week ending) for 5 weeks.
 Songs in A Minor re-entered the top 10 at number 10 on 19 January 2002 (week ending) for 2 weeks and at number 8 on 23 March 2002 (week ending) for 4 weeks.
 Whoa Nelly re-entered the top 10 at number 6 on 26 January 2002 (week ending).
 Escape re-entered the top 10 at number 10 on 4 May 2002 (week ending) for 13 weeks and at number 5 on 24 August 2002 (week ending) for 6 weeks.
 Missundaztood re-entered the top 10 at number 7 on 25 May 2002 (week ending) for 4 weeks and at number 10 on 24 August 2002 (week ending) for 25 weeks.
 Legacy: The Greatest Hits Collection re-entered the top 10 at number 9 on 6 April 2002 (week ending).
 Fever re-entered the top 10 at number 8 on 23 February 2002 (week ending) for 5 weeks, at number 10 on 6 April 2002 (week ending), at number 10 on 18 May 2002 (week ending) for 3 weeks and at number 9 on 22 June 2002 (week ending) for 4 weeks.
 The Very Best of Sting & The Police originally peaked outside the top 10 at number 11 upon its initial release in 1997.
 A Funk Odyssey re-entered the top 10 at number 9 on 16 March 2002 (week ending) for 4 weeks.
 Laundry Service re-entered the top 10 at number 10 on 3 August 2002 (week ending) for 7 weeks.
 J to tha L–O! The Remixes re-entered the top 10 at number 7 on 6 July 2002 (week ending).
 Britney re-entered the top 10 at number 10 on 27 April 2002 (week ending).
 The Platinum Collection originally peaked outside the top 10 at number 63 upon its initial release in 2000.
 The Eminem Show re-entered the top 10 at number 9 on 31 August 2002 (week ending) for 3 weeks, at number 8 on 28 September 2002 (week ending) and at number 8 on 8 February 2003 (week ending).
 Thinking It Over re-entered the top 10 at number 10 on 5 October 2002 (week ending).
 Come Away with Me re-entered the top 10 at number 6 on 17 August 2002 (week ending) for 3 weeks, at number 10 on 14 September 2002 (week ending) for 2 weeks, at number 3 on 10 December 2002 (week ending) for 3 weeks, at number 10 on 22 February 2003 (week ending) for 14 weeks and at number 10 on 20 September 2003 (week ending) for 2 weeks.
 Lickin' on Both Sides re-entered the top 10 at number 10 on 6 July 2002 (week ending).
 Heathen Chemistry re-entered the top 10 at number 8 on 21 September 2002 (week ending) for 5 weeks.
 Nellyville re-entered the top 10 at number 5 on 28 September 2002 (week ending) for 7 weeks.
By the Way re-entered the top 10 at number 10 on 9 November 2002 (week ending), at number 8 on 21 December 2002 (week ending) for 15 weeks, at number 10 on 12 April 2003 (week ending) and at number 10 on 26 April 2003 (week ending).
 Melody AM re-entered the top 10 at number 10 on 8 February 2003 (week ending).
A Rush of Blood to the Head re-entered the top 10 at number 10 on 21 December 2002 (week ending) for 6 weeks, at number 6 on 1 March 2003 (week ending) for 12 weeks and at number 6 on 4 October 2003 (week ending) for 3 weeks.
 Angels with Dirty Faces re-entered the top 10 at number 10 on 11 January 2003 (week ending) for 3 weeks and at number 10 on 15 March 2003 (week ending).
 ELV1S: 30 No. 1 Hits re-entered the top 10 at number 9 on 30 November 2002 (week ending), at number 10 on 14 December 2002 and at number 10 on 28 December 2002 (week ending) for 2 weeks.
 Feels So Good re-entered the top 10 at number 9 on 14 December 2002 (week ending) for 2 weeks.
 Let Go re-entered the top 10 at number 10 on 7 December 2002 (week ending) for 24 weeks.
One By One re-entered the top 10 at number 9 on 25 January 2003 (week ending) for 2 weeks.
 Justified re-entered the top 10 at number 8 on 18 January 2003 (week ending) for eleven weeks and at number 7 on 19 April 2003 (week ending) for twelve weeks.
 The Greatest Hits 1970-2002 re-entered the top 10 at number 6 on 13 September 2003 (week ending) for 2 weeks and at number 8 on 22 November 2003 (week ending). 
 Escapology re-entered the top 10 at number 1 on 16 August 2003 (week ending) for 4 weeks.
 Figure includes album that peaked in 2001.
 Figure includes album that first charted in 2001 but peaked in 2002.

See also
2002 in British music
List of number-one albums from the 2000s (UK)

References
General

Specific

External links
2002 album chart archive at the Official Charts Company (click on relevant week)

United Kingdom top 10 albums
Top 10 albums
2002